Dana B. Chase (1848–1897) was a 19th-century American photographer. Chase was born in Maine and ran two photography studios in Colorado from 1873 to the 1880s. 

After primarily running his practice in Trinidad, Colorado, he moved one of his studios to the Santa Fe plaza, in New Mexico territory. The space Chase occupied in Santa Fe had previously been the studio of the photographer William Henry Brown.

Personal life
Chase had four children with this first wife, Ella. He divorced Ella and married his second wife, Belle, in 1888. He and Belle divorced in 1897. In 1892, he sold his gallery in Santa Fe to Thomas J. Curran, a photographer. Chase died in 1897.

Collections
Photographs by Chase are included in the permanent collections of the Getty Museum, the Amon Carter Museum, the Autry Museum of the American West, the Harwood Museum of Art, among others. The New Mexico History Museum Palace of the Governors photo archives holds 230 of his photographic prints including images of the town of Santa Fe during the territorial period, the Puebloan people and other New Mexico scenes. The photographs were taken between 1884 - 1892.

Gallery

References

1848 births
1897 deaths
Photographers from New Mexico